The 27th century BC was a century that lasted from the year 2700 BC to 2601 BC.

Events

c. 2750–2600 BC: Early Dynastic II Period in Mesopotamia.
c. 2700 BC: The beginning of statuary in Egypt, with shale and limestone statues of Khasekhemwy created in Nekhen.
c. 2698 BC: The supposed beginning of the mythical reign of the legendary Yellow Emperor.
c. 2686–2613 BC: Third Dynasty of Egypt, consisting of the reigns of Djoser, Sekhemkhet, Sanakht (Nebka), Khaba and Huni.
Imhotep, vizier and architect of Djoser, constructs the Pyramid of Djoser, Egypt's earliest stone edifice, in Saqqara.
c. 2650 BC: The supposed reign of the semi-legendary Sumerian king Gilgamesh.
c. 2650 BC: Abandonment of the Mature Harappan settlement at Kalibangan due to the drying-up of the Ghaggar River.
c. 2613–2494 BC: Fourth Dynasty of Egypt.
c. 2670–2620 BC: The reign of the pharaoh Sneferu and his vizier Nefermaat. Sneferu leads a campaign in Nubia and returns with about 7,000 prisoners, who would be employed as servants in the royal estates. Sneferu then sends an expedition to Libya which brings back 11,000 prisoners and 13,100 heads of cattle. Sneferu sends 40 ships to Byblos for the retrieval of cedar wood for the construction of ships. Under Sneferu's reign and that of his son Khufu, copper mines and turquoise quarries are developed in Sinai. The tomb of Hetepheres I, wife of Sneferu and mother of Khufu, demonstrates that cabinetry and jewelry are well-developed. A depiction of plowing painted in the tomb of Itet and Nefermaat in Meidum is the earliest testament to the technique in Africa.

References

 
-3
-73